The 1987–88 1. Slovenská národná hokejová liga season was the 19th season of the 1. Slovenská národná hokejová liga, the second level of ice hockey in Czechoslovakia alongside the 1. Česká národní hokejová liga. 12 teams participated in the league, and TJ Plastika Nitra won the championship. TJ Gumárne 1. mája Púchov was relegated.

Regular season

References

External links
 Season  on avlh.sweb.cz (PDF)

Czech
1st. Slovak National Hockey League seasons
2